Mohan Singh (3 January 1909 – 26 December 1989) was a British Indian Army Indian officer, and member of the Indian Independence Movement best known for organizing and leading the Indian National Army in South East Asia during World War II. Following Indian independence, Mohan Singh later served in public life as a Member of Parliament in the Rajya Sabha (Upper House) of the Indian Parliament. He was a member of the Indian National Army (INA).

Early life 

He was born in a Sikh  family and only son of Tara Singh and Hukam Kaur, a couple of Ugoke village, near Sialkot (now in Pakistan). His father died two months before his birth and his mother shifted to her parents' home in Badiana in the same district, where Mohan Singh was born and brought up.

Military career 
Gen. Mohan Singh passed secondary school and enlisted the 14th Punjab Regiment of the British Indian Army in 1927. After the completion of his recruit training at Hrozpur, he was posted to the 2nd Battalion of the Regiment, then serving in the North-West Frontier Province. He was selected as a potential officer in 1931, and after six months' training in Kitchener College, Nowgong (Madhya Pradesh), and another two and a half years in the Indian Military Academy, Dehradun, he received his commission 1 February 1935 and was posted for a year to a British Army unit, the 2nd battalion Border Regiment. He was then posted to 1st Battalion, 14th Punjab Regiment on 24 February 1936, which at that time happened to be stationed at Jhelum.

Mohan Singh had been promoted temporary Captain when his battalion was earmarked for operational service in the Far East. The battalion was still carrying out intensive training at Secunderabad when he married, in December 1940, Jasvant Kaur, sister of a brother officer. He left for Malaya with his unit on 4 March 1941.

Second World War 
Japan entered the War with her surprise attack on the American air base at Pearl Harbor, Hawaii, on 7 December 1941 and overran the entire South East Asia within a few weeks. The Japanese Imperial General Headquarters in October set up the Fujiwara Kikan, or the F-kikan, in Bangkok, Headed by the Major Fujiwara Iwaichi, chief of intelligence of the 15th army. Tasked with intelligence gathering and contacting the Indian independence movement, the overseas Chinese, and the Malayan Sultan with the aim of encouraging friendship and cooperation with Japan, Fujiwara's staff included five commissioned officers and two Hindi-speaking interpreters. His initial contact was with Giani Pritam Singh. Pritam Singh was a leader of such an organisation. He and Major Fujihara, a Japanese officer, requested Mohan Singh to form an Indian Army comprising the captured Indian soldiers. Mohan Singh hesitated but ultimately agreed. Fujihara handed over about 40,000 Indian soldiers, who had surrendered to him, to Mohan Singh. This was the initial step towards the formation of the first Indian National Army (INA).

Action in Malaya 

The British force in the northern part of the Malaya Peninsula, including Mohan Singh's battalion, 1/14 Punjab Regiment, was fleeing towards the South. Mohan Singh's own forces had been outgunned and destroyed by Japanese forces at Jitra. Captured by Japanese troops after several days in the jungle, Singh was taken to Alor Star to Fujiwara and Pritam Singh at a joint office of the F-Kikan and the IIL. Fujiwara, later self-described as "Lawrence of the Indian National Army" (after Lawrence of Arabia) is said to have been a man committed to the values which his office was supposed to convey to the expatriate nationalist leaders, and found acceptance among them.

Indian National Army 

Although Pritam Singh was involved to a large extent, it was Fujiwara who, with his sincerity of purpose and belief, convinced Mohan Singh to betray his oath to the British Crown by uniting with the Japanese mission for the greater motive of Indian independence. This included the promise that he would be treated as an ally and a friend, and not a prisoner of war. Singh initially helped Fujiwara take control of the situation of looting and arson that had developed in Alor Star; in December 1941, after meeting with the Japanese commanding general, Singh was convinced of its feasibility of raising an armed Indian unit. Between himself, Pritam Singh and Fujiwara, Mohan Singh set about contacting Indians in the British Indian Army in Southeast Asia and also began recruiting from among those captured by the Japanese in Malaya. All Indian prisoners of war and stragglers were placed under his charge, and he was asked to restore order in the town of Alor Star. Thus the nucleus of what came to be the Ajad Hind Fauj also known as Indian National Army was born. Kuala Lumpur fell on 11 January 1942 with 3,500 Indian prisoners of war, and Singapore on 15 February with 85,000 British troops, of whom 45,000 were Indians. Mohan Singh asked for volunteers who would form the Ajad Hind Fauj (literally translates to Free India Army) to fight for Indian independence from the British rule.

A large number of men came forward to join what came to be termed as the Ajad Hind Fauj (National Army of independent India). The new set-up came into being on 1 September 1942 by which time the strength of volunteers had reached 40,000. Mohan Singh, now the General General, was to command it. Already in a conference held at Bangkok during 15–23 June 1942, the Indian Independence League under the leadership of Rash Behari Bose, an Indian revolutionary who had escaped to Japan in June 1915 and who had been living there ever since, had been inaugurated. Through one of the 35 resolutions passed by the conference, Mohan Singh was appointed commander-in-chief of the "Army of Liberation for India," i.e. the Indian National Army.

Disagreements with Japan 
Though Mohan Singh had kept a good relationship with the members of Fujiwara Kikan, he was soon disenchanted with the headquarters of the Japanese Army and doubted their intentions based on their orders. It appeared that they wanted to use the Indian National Army only as a part of the Japanese army and were deliberately withholding recognition and public proclamation about its existence as an independent army. Some supreme commanders of the Japanese army had disagreements with him. On 29 December 1942, Mohan Singh was removed from his command and taken into custody by the Japanese military police.

It was only after the arrival of another Indian leader of great political standing, Subhas Chandra Bose, from Germany to the Far-Eastern front in June 1943 that the Indian National Army was revived in the form of Azad Hind Fauj. However, Mohan Singh could not be reinstated to the revived army.

Upon Japan's defeat, Mohan Singh was taken into custody by the British and repatriated to India to face trials. However, due to public pressure, roused by the INA Red Fort trials, Mohan Singh was only cashiered from the Army. He subsequently served in the Indian Parliament as a member of the Rajya Sabha (Upper House).

1947 and later

Singh entered politics and joined the Indian National Congress in February 1947. His dream of independence was realized with India's Independence on 15 August 1947, but this was accompanied by the partition of the country into India and Pakistan. He had to leave his hearth and home in what then became Pakistan and came to India a homeless refugee. He was allotted some land in the village of Jugiana, near Ludhiana, where he settled permanently. After a stint as a legislator in the Punjab, he was elected to Rajya Sabha, the upper house of Indian Parliament, for two terms. In and out of Parliament he strove for the recognition of the members of his Azad Hind Fauj as "freedom fighters" in the cause of the nation's independence.

Death
Mohan Singh died at Jugiana on 26 December 1989.

Notes

Bibliography 

"Mohan Singh, General, Soldiers Contribution to Indian Independence Delhi, 1974"
 .
.

External links 
General Mohan Singh  at the Sikh History.

Indian Sikhs
Sikh warriors
Punjabi people
Indian generals
Indian revolutionaries
World War II political leaders
Indian National Army personnel
Rajya Sabha members from Punjab, India
1909 births
1989 deaths
Military history of Malaya during World War II
British Indian Army officers
Indian Army personnel of World War II
Indian prisoners of war
World War II prisoners of war held by Japan
Collaborators with Imperial Japan
Indian Military Academy alumni